Orbaneja del Castillo is a hamlet and minor local entity located in the municipality of Valle de Sedano, in Burgos province, Castile and León, Spain. As of 2020, it has a population of 47.

Geography 
Orbaneja del Castillo is located 67km north of Burgos.

References

Populated places in the Province of Burgos